The European Neolithic is the period when Neolithic (New Stone Age) technology was present in Europe, roughly between 7000 BCE (the approximate time of the first farming societies in Greece) and c.2000–1700 BCE (the beginning of the Bronze Age in Scandinavia). The Neolithic overlaps the Mesolithic and Bronze Age periods in Europe as cultural changes moved from the southeast to northwest at about 1 km/year – this is called the Neolithic Expansion.

The duration of the Neolithic varies from place to place, its end marked by the introduction of bronze tools: in southeast Europe it is approximately 4,000 years (i.e. 7000 BCE–3000 BCE) while in parts of Northwest Europe it is just under 3,000 years (c. 4500 BCE–1700 BCE). In parts of Europe, notably the Balkans, the period after  is known as the Chalcolithic (Copper Age), due to the invention of copper smelting and the prevalence of copper tools, weapons and other artefacts.

The spread of the Neolithic from the Near East Neolithic to Europe was first studied quantitatively in the 1970s, when a sufficient number of 14C age determinations for early Neolithic sites had become available. Ammerman and Cavalli-Sforza discovered a linear relationship between the age of an Early Neolithic site and its distance from the conventional source in the Near East (Jericho), thus demonstrating that the Neolithic spread at an average speed of about 1 km/yr. More recent studies confirm these results and yield the speed of 0.6–1.3 km/yr at 95% confidence level.

Basic cultural characteristics

Regardless of specific chronology, many European Neolithic groups share basic characteristics, such as living in small-scale, family-based communities, subsisting on domesticated plants and animals supplemented with the collection of wild plant foods and with hunting, and producing hand-made pottery, that is, pottery made without the potter's wheel. Polished stone axes lie at the heart of the neolithic (new stone) culture, enabling forest clearance for agriculture and production of wood for dwellings, as well as fuel.

There are also many differences, with some Neolithic communities in southeastern Europe living in heavily fortified settlements of 3,000–4,000 people (e.g., Sesklo in Greece) whereas Neolithic groups in Britain were small (possibly 50–100 people) and highly mobile cattle-herders.

The details of the origin, chronology, social organization, subsistence practices and ideology of the peoples of Neolithic Europe are obtained from archaeology, and not historical records, since these people left none. Since the 1970s, population genetics has provided independent data on the population history of Neolithic Europe, including migration events and genetic relationships with peoples in South Asia.

A further independent tool, linguistics, has contributed hypothetical reconstructions of early European languages and family trees with estimates of dating of splits, in particular theories on the relationship between speakers of Indo-European languages and Neolithic peoples. Some archaeologists believe that the expansion of Neolithic peoples from southwest Asia into Europe, marking the eclipse of Mesolithic culture, coincided with the introduction of Indo-European speakers, whereas other archaeologists and many linguists believe the Indo-European languages were introduced from the Pontic-Caspian steppe during the succeeding Bronze Age.

Archaeology

Archeologists trace the emergence of food-producing societies in the Levantine region of southwest Asia to the close of the last glacial period around 12,000 BCE, and these developed into a number of regionally distinctive cultures by the eighth millennium BCE. Neolithic groups appear soon afterwards in the Balkans and south-central Europe. The Neolithic cultures of southeastern Europe (the Balkans and the Aegean) show some continuity with groups in southwest Asia and Anatolia (e.g., Çatalhöyük).

In 2018, an 8,000-year-old ceramic figurine portraying the head of the "Mother Goddess", was found near Uzunovo, Vidin Province in Bulgaria, which pushes back the Neolithic revolution to 7th millennium BCE.

Current evidence suggests that Neolithic material culture was introduced to Europe via western Anatolia, and that similarities in cultures of North Africa and the Pontic steppes are due to diffusion out of Europe. All Neolithic sites in Europe contain ceramics, and contain the plants and animals domesticated in Southwest Asia: einkorn, emmer, barley, lentils, pigs, goats, sheep, and cattle. Genetic data suggest that no independent domestication of animals took place in Neolithic Europe, and that all domesticated animals were originally domesticated in Southwest Asia. The only domesticate not from Southwest Asia was broomcorn millet, domesticated in East Asia. The earliest evidence of cheese-making dates to 5500 BCE in Kuyavia, Poland.

Archaeologists agreed for some time that the culture of the early Neolithic is relatively homogeneous, compared to the late Mesolithic. DNA studies tend to confirm this, indicating that agriculture was brought to Western Europe by the Aegean populations, that are known as 'the Aegean Neolithic farmers'. When these farmers arrived in Britain, DNA studies show that they did not seem to mix much with the earlier population of the Western Hunter-Gatherers. Instead, there was a substantial population replacement.

The diffusion of these farmers across Europe, from the Aegean to Britain, took about 2,500 years (6500–4000 BCE). The Baltic region was penetrated a bit later, and there was also a delay in settling the Pannonian plain. In general, colonization shows a "saltatory" pattern, as the Neolithic advanced from one patch of fertile alluvial soil to another, bypassing mountainous areas. Analysis of radiocarbon dates show clearly that Mesolithic and Neolithic populations lived side by side for as much as a millennium in many parts of Europe, especially in the Iberian peninsula and along the Atlantic coast.

Investigation of the Neolithic skeletons found in the Talheim Death Pit suggests that prehistoric men from neighboring tribes were prepared to fight and kill each other in order to capture and secure women. The mass grave at Talheim in southern Germany is one of the earliest known sites in the archaeological record that shows evidence of organised violence in Early Neolithic Europe, among various Linear Pottery culture tribes.

In terms of overall size, some settlements of the Cucuteni–Trypillia culture, such as Talianki (with a population of around 15,000) in western Ukraine, were as large as the city-states of Sumer in the Fertile Crescent, and these Eastern European settlements predate the Sumerian cities by more than half of a millennium.

End of the Neolithic 
With some exceptions, population levels rose rapidly at the beginning of the Neolithic until they reached the carrying capacity. This was followed by a population crash of "enormous magnitude" after 5000 BCE, with levels remaining low during the next 1,500 years.

Transition to the Copper age 

Populations began to rise after 3500 BCE, with further dips and rises occurring between 3000 and 2500 BCE but varying in date between regions. Around this time is the Neolithic decline, when populations collapsed across most of Europe, possibly caused by climatic conditions, plague, or mass migration. A study of twelve European regions found most experienced boom and bust patterns and suggested an "endogenous, not climatic cause".

The Chalcolithic Age in Europe started from about 3500 BC, followed soon after by the European Bronze Age. This also became a period of increased megalithic construction. From 3500 BCE, copper was being used in the Balkans and eastern and central Europe. Also, the domestication of the horse took place during that time, resulting in the increased mobility of cultures.

Nearing the close of the Neolithic, large numbers of Eurasian steppe peoples migrated in Central and Eastern Europe.

Gallery

Genetics

Genetic studies since the 2010s have identified the genetic contribution of Neolithic farmers to modern European populations, providing quantitative results relevant to the long-standing "replacement model" vs. "demic diffusion" dispute in archaeology.

The earlier population of Europe were the Mesolithic hunter-gatherers, called the "Western Hunter-Gatherers" (WHG). Along with the Scandinavian Hunter-Gatherers (SHG) and Eastern Hunter-Gatherers (EHG), the WHGs constituted one of the three main genetic groups in the postglacial period of early Holocene Europe. Later, the Neolithic farmers expanded from the Aegean and Near East; in various studies, they are described as the Early European Farmers (EEF); Aegean Neolithic Farmers (ANF), First European Farmers (FEF), or also as the Early Neolithic Farmers (ENF).

A seminal 2014 study first identified the contribution of three main components to modern European lineages (the third being "Ancient North Eurasians", associated with the later Indo-European expansion). The EEF component was identified based on the genome of a woman buried c. 7,000 years ago in a Linear Pottery culture grave in Stuttgart, Germany.

This 2014 study found evidence for genetic mixing between WHG and EEF throughout Europe, with the largest contribution of EEF in Mediterranean Europe (especially in Sardinia, Sicily, Malta and among Ashkenazi Jews), and the largest contribution of WHG in Northern Europe and among Basque people.

Nevertheless, when the Neolithic farmers arrived in Britain, DNA studies show that these two groups did not seem to mix much. Instead, there was a substantial population replacement.

Since 2014, further studies have refined the picture of interbreeding between EEF and WHG. In a 2017 analysis of 180 ancient DNA datasets of the Chalcolithic and Neolithic periods from Hungary, Germany and Spain, evidence was found of a prolonged period of interbreeding. Admixture took place regionally, from local hunter-gatherer populations, so that populations from the three regions (Germany, Iberia and Hungary) were genetically distinguishable at all stages of the Neolithic period, with a gradually increasing ratio of WHG ancestry of farming populations over time. This suggests that after the initial expansion of early farmers, there were no further long-range migrations substantial enough to homogenize the farming population, and that farming and hunter-gatherer populations existed side by side for many centuries, with ongoing gradual admixture throughout the 5th to 4th millennia BCE (rather than a single admixture event on initial contact). Admixture rates varied geographically; in the late Neolithic, WHG ancestry in farmers in Hungary was at around 10%, in Germany around 25% and in Iberia as high as 50%.

During late Neolithic and early Bronze Age, the EEF-derived cultures of Europe were overwhelmed by successive invasions of Western Steppe Herders (WSHs) from the Pontic–Caspian steppe. These invasions led to EEF paternal DNA lineages in Europe being almost entirely replaced with WSH paternal DNA (mainly R1b and R1a). EEF mtDNA however remained frequent, suggesting admixture between WSH males and EEF females.

Language

There is no direct evidence of the languages spoken in the Neolithic. Some proponents of paleolinguistics attempt to extend the methods of historical linguistics to the Stone Age, but this has little academic support. Criticising scenarios which envision for the Neolithic only a small number of language families spread over huge areas of Europe (as in modern times), Donald Ringe has argued on general principles of language geography (as concerns "tribal", pre-state societies), and the scant remains of (apparently indigenous) non-Indo-European languages attested in ancient inscriptions, that Neolithic Europe must have been a place of great linguistic diversity, with many language families with no recoverable linguistic links to each other, much like western North America prior to European colonisation.

Discussion of hypothetical languages spoken in the European Neolithic is divided into two topics, Indo-European languages and "Pre-Indo-European" languages.

Early Indo-European languages are usually assumed to have reached Danubian (and maybe Central) Europe in the Chalcolithic or early Bronze Age, e.g. with the Corded Ware or Beaker cultures (see also Kurgan hypothesis for related discussions). The Anatolian hypothesis postulates arrival of Indo-European languages with the early Neolithic. Old European hydronymy is taken by Hans Krahe to be the oldest reflection of the early presence of Indo-European in Europe.

Theories of "Pre-Indo-European" languages in Europe are built on scant evidence. The Basque language is the best candidate for a descendant of such a language, but since Basque is a language isolate, there is no comparative evidence to build upon. Theo Vennemann nevertheless postulates a "Vasconic" family, which he supposes had co-existed with an "Atlantic" or "Semitidic" (i. e., para-Semitic) group. Another candidate is a Tyrrhenian family which would have given rise to Etruscan and Raetic in the Iron Age, and possibly also Aegean languages such as Minoan or Pelasgian in the Bronze Age.

In the north, a similar scenario to Indo-European is thought to have occurred with Uralic languages expanding in from the east. In particular, while the Sami languages of the indigenous Sami people belong in the Uralic family, they show considerable substrate influence, thought to represent one or more extinct original languages. The Sami are estimated to have adopted a Uralic language less than 2,500 years ago. Some traces of indigenous languages of the Baltic area have been suspected in the Finnic languages as well, but these are much more modest. There are early loanwords from unidentified non-IE languages in other Uralic languages of Europe as well.

Guus Kroonen brought up the so-called "Agricultural Substrate Hypothesis", based on the comparison of presumable Pre-Germanic and Pre-Greek substrate lexicon (especially agricultural terms without clear IE etymologies). Kroonen links that substrate to the gradual spread of agriculture in Neolithic Europe from Anatolia and the Balkans, and associates the Pre-Germanic agricultural substrate language with the Linear Pottery culture. The prefix *a- and the suffix *-it- are the most apparent linguistic markers by which a small group of "Agricultural" substrate words - i.e. *arwīt ("pea") or *gait ("goat") - can be isolated from the rest of the Proto-Germanic lexicon. According to Aljoša Šorgo, there are at least 36 Proto-Germanic lexical items very likely originating from the "agricultural" substrate language (or a group of closely related languages). It is proposed by Šorgo that the Agricultural substrate was characterized by a four-vowel system of */æ/ */ɑ/ */i/ */u/, the presence of pre-nasalized stops, the absence of a semi-vowel */j/, a mobile stress accent, and reduction of unstressed vowels.

List of cultures and sites

 Mesolithic
 Lepenski Vir culture (10th to 7th millennia)
 Megalithic culture (8th to 2nd millennia)
 Early Neolithic
 Franchthi Cave (20th to 3rd millennia) Greece. First European Neolithic site.
 Sesklo (7th millennium) Greece.
 Starčevo-Criș culture (Starčevo I, Körös, Criş, Central Balkans, 7th to 5th millennia)
 Dudești culture (6th millennium)
 Middle Neolithic
 La Almagra pottery culture (Andalusia, 6th to 5th millennia)
 Vinča culture (6th to 3rd millennia)
 Hamangia culture (Romania, Bulgaria c. 5200 to 4500 BC)
 Linear Pottery culture (6th to 5th millennia)
 Circular enclosures
 Butmir culture (5100–4500 BC)
 Cardium pottery culture (Mediterranean coast, 7th to 4th millennia)
 Pit–Comb Ware culture, a.k.a. Comb Ceramic culture (Northeast Europe, 6th to 3rd millennia)
 Cucuteni-Trypillian culture (Moldova, Ukraine, Romania, c. 5200 to 3500 BC)
 Ertebølle culture (Denmark, 5th to 3rd millennia)
 Cortaillod culture (Switzerland, 4th millennium)
 Hembury culture (Britain, 5th to 4th millennia)
 Boian culture (Romania, Bulgaria c. 4300 to 3500 BC)
 Windmill Hill culture (Britain, 3rd millennium)
 Pfyn culture (Switzerland, 4th millennium)
 Globular Amphora culture (Central Europe, 4th to 3rd millennia)
 Horgen culture (Switzerland, 4th to 3rd millennia)
 Eneolithic (Chalcolithic)
 Lengyel culture (5th millennium)
 A culture in Central Europe produced monumental arrangements of circular ditches between 4800 BCE and 4600 BCE.
 Varna culture (5th millennium)
 Funnelbeaker culture (4th millennium)
Eutresis culture (Greece, 4th to 3rd Millennium BC)
 Yamnaya culture (3300 BCE to 2600 BCE)
 Baden culture (Central Europe, 4th to 3rd millennia)
 Vučedol culture (North-west Balkans, Pannonian Plain, late 4th to 3rd millennia)
 Los Millares culture (Almería, Spain, 4th to 2nd millennia)
 Corded Ware culture, a.k.a. Battle-axe or Single Grave culture (Northern Europe, 3rd millennium)
 Gaudo culture (3rd millennium, early Bronze Age, in Italian)
 Beaker culture (3rd to 2nd millennia, early Bronze Age)
 Stonehenge, Skara Brae

Megalithic

Some Neolithic cultures listed above are known for constructing megaliths. These occur primarily on the Atlantic coast of Europe, but there are also megaliths on western Mediterranean islands.
 : Constructions in Portugal (Évora). Emergence of the Atlantic Neolithic period, the age of agriculture along the fertile shores of Europe.
 : Constructions in Brittany (Barnenez) and Poitou (Bougon).
 : Constructions in Brittany (Carnac), Portugal (Lisbon), Spain (Galicia and Andalusia), France (central and southern), Corsica, England, Wales, Northern Ireland (Banbridge) and elsewhere.
 : Constructions in Ireland (Carrowmore and elsewhere) and Spain (Dolmen of Menga, Antequera Dolmens Site, Málaga).
 : Constructions in England (Maumbury Rings and Godmanchester), and Malta (Ġgantija and Mnajdra temples).
 : Constructions in Spain (Dolmen of Viera, Antequera Dolmens Site, Málaga, and Guadiana), Ireland (south-west), France (Arles and the north), north-west and central Italy (Piedmont, Valle d'Aosta, Liguria and Tuscany), Mediterranean islands (Sardinia, Sicily, Malta) and elsewhere in the Mediterranean, Belgium (north-east) and Germany (central and south-west).
 : Constructions in Ireland (Newgrange), Netherlands (north-east), Germany (northern and central) Sweden and Denmark.
 : Constructions in Malta (Ħaġar Qim and Tarxien).
 : Constructions in France (Saumur, Dordogne, Languedoc, Biscay, and the Mediterranean coast), Spain (Los Millares), Belgium (Ardennes), and Orkney, as well as the first henges (circular earthworks) in Britain.
 : Constructions in Spain (Tholos of El Romeral, Antequera Dolmens Site, Málaga)
 : Climax of the megalithic Funnel-beaker culture in Denmark, and the construction of the henge at Stonehenge.

See also

 Chalcolithic Europe
 Germanic substrate hypothesis
 Indo-Iranian migration
 Neolithic tomb
 Old European culture
 Pre-Indo-European languages
 Proto-Indo-European language
 Proto-Indo-Europeans
 Vinča symbols

References

Sources

Further reading

External links

 
 The genetic structure of the world's first farmers, Lazaridis et al, 2016
 Massive migration from the steppe is a source for Indo-European languages in Europe, Haak et al, 2015
 Population genomics of Bronze Age Eurasia, Allentoft et al, 2015
 Eight thousand years of natural selection in Europe, Mathieson et al, 2015
 "The Horse, the Wheel and Language, How Bronze-Age Riders from the Eurasian Steppes shaped the Modern World", David W Anthony, 2007
 General table of Neolithic sites in Europe
 Mario Alinei, et al., Paleolithic Continuity Theory of Indo-European Origins
 culture.gouv.fr: Life along the Danube 6500 years ago

 
Prehistoric Europe
Pre-Indo-Europeans
.03